ANLP may refer to:
African Nutrition Leadership Programme
Association for Neuro Linguistic Programming